Mark Ivan White (born 26 October 1958) is an English former professional footballer who played as a left back.

Career
Born in Sheffield, White played for Sheffield United and Reading.

Between March and August 1979, White was one of the Reading back five that kept a clean sheet for 1,103 minutes – a record that stood until broken by Manchester United.

References

1958 births
Living people
Footballers from Sheffield
English footballers
Sheffield United F.C. players
Reading F.C. players
English Football League players
Association football fullbacks